is a former Japanese musician and singer-songwriter. He was lead vocalist of the rock band Boøwy from 1981 to 1988. After the band disbanded he started a successful solo career, becoming one of Japan's best-selling artists. In 2003, HMV Japan ranked Himuro at number 76 on their list of the 100 most important Japanese pop acts. He currently lives in Los Angeles, California.

Life and career
He was born , pronounced the same but written with different characters, before adopting his stage name at the end of 1984.

Himuro has frequently played music with Steve Stevens, best known as the backing guitarist for Billy Idol. For example, Stevens participated in Himuro's album as a guitarist and his concert tour after his album I·De·A.

On August 22, 2004, he held a concert, entitled "21st Century Boøwys VS Himuro", at the Tokyo Dome. He sang many Boøwy songs, the first time in sixteen years.

"Wild Romance" was used as the ending theme music for the Japanese dubbed version of Van Helsing  and for the Japanese releases of Yakuza 5

Himuro's song "Calling", from his 1989 album Neo Fascio, was used in the ending credits to the highly anticipated 2005 CG Film Final Fantasy VII Advent Children. The film's director, Tetsuya Nomura, has noted that Himuro's music has been highly influential in his own work, and when asked about his contribution to the film, Himuro said that he was happy his work would be used in "the best CG movie ever made in Japan".

On August 5 and 6, 2006, he held a concert called "Kyosuke Himuro + Glay 2006 at Ajonomoto-Stadium "Swing Addition"" with Japanese band Glay in Ajinomoto Stadium. In addition, Himuro released first collaborated single with Glay called "Answer" on August 2, 2006.

The Japanese release of Final Fantasy VII Advent Children Complete features a new ending song by Himuro, replacing the original use of "Calling". "Safe and Sound" is the title and it features My Chemical Romance lead singer Gerard Way. "Safe and Sound" was released on the iTunes Store on April 29, 2009. However, the North American release does not contain "Safe and Sound", but instead continues to feature "Calling".

Himuro held two consecutive sold-out charity concerts at the Tokyo Dome on June 20, 2011, attracting over 104,000 people making them the biggest charity live event ever held in Japan. The raised sum of 669,220,940 yen (around US$8.7 million) was donated to Fukushima, Miyagi, and Iwate prefectures, for recovery after the 2011 Tōhoku earthquake and tsunami.

In 2016, he had a retirement tour in Japan and officially retired from music activities due to his hearing impairment. He currently lives in Los Angeles, California, where he purchased a 12,500 square feet palatial residence in Beverly Hills in 2004 for $6.4 million, which was previously owned by Shaquille O'Neal.

Discography

Studio albums 
 Flowers for Algernon (September 1, 1988), Oricon Weekly Albums Chart Peak Position: No. 1
 Neo Fascio (September 27, 1989) No. 1
 Higher Self (April 6, 1991) No. 1
 Memories of Blue (January 7, 1993) No. 1
 Shake the Fake (September 26, 1994) No. 1
 Missing Piece (September 30, 1996) No. 1
 I·De·A (December 10, 1997) No. 1
 Mellow (February 23, 2000) No. 5
 Beat Haze Odyssey (October 18, 2000) No. 3
 Follow the Wind (August 20, 2003) No. 2
 In the Mood (December 20, 2006) No. 3
 "B"orderless (September 8, 2010) No. 3

Singles 
 "Angel" (July 21, 1988), Oricon Weekly Singles Chart Peak Position: No. 1
 "Dear Algernon" (October 7, 1988) No. 2
 "Summer Game" (July 26, 1989) No. 1
  No. 2
  No. 1
 "Crime of Love" (February 27, 1991) No. 2
 "Urban Dance" (February 26, 1992) No. 2
 "Good Luck My Love" (November 7, 1992) No. 5
 "Kiss Me" (December 7, 1992) No. 1
 "Virgin Beat" (August 29, 1994) No. 1
  No. 2
 "Stay" (June 24, 1996) No. 1
 "Squall" (August 15, 1996) No. 1
 "Waltz" (January 15, 1997) No. 4
 "Native Stranger" (June 4, 1997) No. 2
 "Heat" (October 29, 1997) No. 5
  No. 6
  No. 3
  No. 13
  No. 81
 "Girls Be Glamorous" (January 1, 2001) No. 10
 "Claudia" (July 20, 2003) No. 10
 "Wild Romance" (September 8, 2004) No. 6
 "Easy Love/Bitch as Witch" (February 8, 2006) No. 6
 "Answer" (August 2, 2006)
Glay feat. Kyosuke Himuro
 "Sweet Revolution/In the Nude ~Even Not in the Mood~" (October 4, 2006) No. 3
 "Safe and Sound" (April 29, 2009)
 Kyosuke Himuro feat. Gerard Way
 "Bang the Beat/Safe and Sound" (July 14, 2010) No. 3
 "If You Want" (March 14, 2012) No. 4
 "Warriors" (September 26, 2012) No. 5
 "North of Eden" (May 1, 2013) No. 6
 "One Life" (July 16, 2014) No. 6

Compilations 
 Singles (July 19, 1995) No. 1
 Collective Souls ~The Best of Best~ (June 24, 1998) No. 4
 Ballad ~ La Pluie (September 27, 2001) No. 7
 Case of Himuro (March 19, 2003) No. 7
 20th Anniversary All Singles Complete Best "Just Movin' On" ~All The-S-Hit~ (June 11, 2008) No. 1
 Kyosuke Himuro 25th Anniversary Best Album Greatest Anthology (August 21, 2013) No. 1
 L'épilogue (April 13, 2016) No. 1

Live albums 
 The One Night Stands ~Tour "Collective Souls" 1998~ (December 9, 1998) No. 6
 21st Century Boøwys Vs Himuro (December 24, 2004) No. 8

Others 
 Lover's Day Double Happiness (August 21, 1991)
 Masterpiece #12 (April 25, 1992) No. 1
 Lover's Day II (January 27, 1999)
 Final Fantasy VII Advent Children Original Soundtrack (September 28, 2005)
Tour 2010-11 Borderless "50x50 Rock' N' Roll Suicide" -Official Pirates Mix 20101231--Official Pirates Mix 20101230- (February 7, 2011)
Official Pirates Mix (February 3, 2012)
「Crossover 12-13 Day 1 20121230」 (January 15, 2013)
「Crossover 12-13 Day 2 20121231」 (January 15, 2013)

Home videos 
 King of Rock Show of 88's-89's Turning Process (June 28, 1989 / dvd 2009), Oricon DVDs Chart Peak Position: No. 20
 Neo Fascio Turning Point (July 25, 1990 / dvd 2009) No. 26
 Birth of Lovers (December 1990)
 Over Soul Matrix (November 27, 1991 / dvd 2009) No. 30
 Captured Clips (April 28, 1993)
 Live at the Tokyo Dome Shake the Fake Tour (December 25, 1995 / dvd 2009) No. 23
 Missing Piece (May 14, 1997)
 The One Night Stands - Tour "Collective Souls" 1998 (December 24, 1998 / dvd 2009) No. 18
 100152 (December 24, 1999 / dvd 2000) No. 14
 Digital BeatNix Tower (October 18, 2000) No. 2
 Case of Himuro 15th Anniversary Special Live (November 25, 2003) No. 10
 Higher Than Heaven ~ At Yoyogi National Stadium" (August 18, 2004) No. 5
 21st Century Boøwys VS Himuro (December 24, 2004)
 Soul Standing By〜 (2005)
 Kyosuke Himuro/Captured Clips 1988-2006 (2006) No. 8
 Kyosuke Himuro Tour 2007 "In the Mood" (2008) No. 2
 20th Anniversary Tour 2008 Just Movin' On -Moral~Present- (2009) No. 3
 L’egoiste (2009) No. 8
 Kyosuke Himuro Countdown Live Crossover 05-06 1st Stage/2nd Stage (2009) No. 7
 20th Anniversary Tour 2008 Just Movin' On -Moral~Present- Special Live at Budokan (2009)
  No. 2
 Kyosuke Himuro Tour 2010-11 Borderless 50x50 Rock' N' Roll Suicide (2012) No. 6
 21st Century Boøwys Vs Himuro "An Attempt to Discover New Truths" (2012) No. 8
 Special Gigs The Borderless From Boøwy to Himuro (2012)
 KYOSUKE HIMURO TOUR2010-11 BORDERLESS 50×50 ROCK'N'ROLL SUICIDE (2012)
 KYOSUKE HIMURO 25th Anniversary TOUR GREATEST ANTHOLOGY-NAKED- FINAL DESTINATION DAY-01 (2015)
 KYOSUKE HIMURO LAST GIGS (2017)

Cover songs 
Himuro has covered several songs. Although "Keep the Faith" was composed by Himuro himself.

 "Suffragette City" by David Bowie on B-side of his 1988 single Dear Algernon.
 "Accidents Will Happen" by Elvis Costello on B-side of his 1989 single Misty.
 "Miss Murder" by AFI on his 2006 album In the Mood.
 "Pain" by Jimmy Eat World on his 2006 album In the Mood.
 "Keep the Faith" by KAT-TUN on his 2008 compilation album 20th Anniversary All Singles Complete Best Just Movin' on ~All The-S-Hit~ 
 "Time for Miracles" by Adam Lambert on his 2010 album "B"orderless.

See also
 List of best-selling music artists in Japan

References

External links 
  

1960 births
Living people
People from Takasaki, Gunma
Japanese-language singers
Japanese male pop singers
Japanese male rock singers
Japanese male singer-songwriters
Japanese expatriates in the United States
Video game musicians
Musicians from Gunma Prefecture
20th-century Japanese male singers
21st-century Japanese male singers